Servant of God Maria da Conceição Santos (religious name: Benigna Victima de Jesus; Diamantina, August 16, 1907 – Belo Horizonte, October 16, 1981), better known as Sister Benigna, was an Afro-Brazilian mother superior and religious. 

On October 15, 2011, the process of her beatification was opened by the Archdiocese of Belo Horizonte. On February 18, 2022, Pope Francis enacted a decree recognizing her heroic virtues.

Life

Early years 
On August 16, 1907, she was born in the mining town of Diamantina, and registered as Maria da Conceição Santos. From a simple family, she received from her parents a Catholic religious education since childhood. Even as little a girl, she revealed divine gifts and manifested a vocation for religious life. She participated in celebrations of Holy Mass, coronations, processions and prayers of the rosary. In her homeland, Maria took the primary and learned to play various musical instruments. As a catechist and guitar teacher, she evangelized children and adults.

Religious life 
On February 11, 1935, day dedicated to Our Lady of Lourdes, Maria joined the Congregation of the Auxiliary Sisters of Our Lady of Piety. On March 19, 1936, the day dedicated to St. Joseph, she made her first religious vows in this congregation of Minas Gerais, and from this date on, became Sister Benigna Victima de Jesus.

She began her apostolate by providing religious services in the places designated by the congregation. The Manoel Gonçalves de Souza Moreira Charity House, in Itaúna, was the first place where she worked. There, she took perpetual vows on January 6, 1941, and graduated from nursing. On January 1, 1943, she was appointed Mother Superior, thus assuming the direction of this house. In his new position, she founded a maternity hospital that assisted needy mothers.

Sister Benigna suffered slander, such as rumors of a possible pregnancy and the accusation of being a communist nun, and was therefore, in 1948, transferred in a police car to Asilo São Luiz, in Serra da Piedade, in Caeté, where she learned of the demolition of the maternity in Itaúna. 

In Serra da Piedade, Sister Benigna was placed in a sty, thus acquiring various diseases. José Nogueira, doctor and friend, when visiting her, realized the extreme fragility of her health and, fearing the worst, communicated the fact to the director of the house, telling him that the congregation would be held responsible if something happened to the religious. 

In 1950, Sister Benigna was assigned to provide services as a midwife and nurse in an asylum hospital in the city of Lambari.

In 1955, Sister Benigna went to Our Lady of Lourdes College, in Lavras. To the students of the school, she taught piety, faith and devotion to Our Lady. It was common to find distressed students asking Sister Benigna for prayers to do well in the exams. In honor of Our Lady of Lourdes, Sister Benigna built a cave that was destroyed, shortly after her transfer to the city of Sabará. In this city, in the year 1960, Sister Benigna worked at the Holy House of Mercy.

In 1963, Sister Benigna returned to provide her services at Asilo São Luiz, remaining there until 1966, when she was called to help rebuild the Lar Augusto Silva, in Lavras.

Sister Benigna lived in this house for the last sixteen years of her life. As an aftertouch of Jesus and devout of Our Lady, she helped all those in need. She was always sought after by people from all walks of life. She had great friends in Belo Horizonte, Lavras and other regions of Minas Gerais, who always had her in difficulties. When food was missing from the asylum, she called these friends and was soon taken care of. 

On June 30, 1977, in recognition of the work done to the community of Lavras, the city council, by unanimous vote, conferred Sister Benigna the title of honorary citizen.

On August 16, 1980, Sister Benigna, with the help of her friends, inaugurated the Chapel of St. Joseph, allowing Eucharistic celebrations to be held for the elderly of the asylum in a nearby place. On August 16, 1981, in honor of Our Lady of Lourdes, she inaugurated a beautiful grotto, in front of the Chapel of St. Joseph.

Illness and death 
On the night of October 12 of the same year, Sister Benigna was admitted to the urgent care center of Prontocor Hospital, in Belo Horizonte, with severe chest pains. A pacemaker was placed in an attempt to save his life. Even though her health was very poor, she, in the bed of that hospital, prayed with everyone who sought her. 

On October 16, 1981, Sister Benigna died.

Devotion 
Sister Benigna, even after her death, remains a popular figure. Her name elevates and praises the Congregation of the Auxiliary Sisters of Our Lady of Piety. Thousands of devotees continue to ask for her intercession because of the countless miracles attributed to her.

She is recognized as the Saint of the Hour, besides having become for her devotees the Saint of the Hail Queen and of Prosperity, due to the strength of her intercession. Every Monday, at 14:00, faithful gathered in prayer in his tomb, in the Cemetery of Bonfim, where Holy Mass was celebrated and prayed, then the Novena of Our Lady of the Rosary of Pompeii. After the transfer of the remains of the religious to the Novitiate Our Lady of Piety, both The Holy Mass and the Novena were transferred to the Sanctuary of Our Lady of Conception, in the Lagoinha neighborhood, where devout members, keeping the same day and time, continue to gather in prayer, in the desire that, soon, she is revered in churches of Brazil and the world.

References

External links 
 Association of Friends of Sister Benigna

Brazilian Servants of God
People from Diamantina
1981 deaths
1907 births
Afro-Brazilian people